Islamic Welfare Society is a nonprofit organization located in Jaunpur. It was established in 1996.

History

Islamic Welfare Society was established by Maulana Anwar Ahmed Qasmi, Abu Akram and Maulana Abul Wafa which was registered in 1996 and established the first school "Jamia Momina Lil Banat” in 1999. The school was firstly started under a tin shade but later society acquired the land and built buildings that serves 1 200 girls students. It is completely a non-political organization.

Under this society near about 30 schools are established, 1000 hand pumps have been installed in the poor localities to meet the water crisis.

Goals

 Establish educational and religious establishments.
 Install hand pumps in places with water shortage.
 Provide technical and vocational training to the poor to provide employment opportunities.
 Provide scholarship to poor children.

References 

India
Islamic organisations based in India
Islamic organizations established in 1996